Cyperus congestus, commonly known as dense flat-sedge or clustered flat-sedge, is a sedge of the family Cyperaceae that is native to southern Africa mostly in South Africa, Lesotho and Namibia.

Description
It blooms between July and March produces brown flowers. The sedge has a short rhizome connecting plants together. The culms are smooth and triangular in cross section, they are a pink-red toward the base.
Between two and seven inflorescences can be found on each stem.

Taxonomy
The species was first formally described by the botanist Martin Vahl in 1805 as part of the work Enumeratio Plantarum The name of the species is often misapplied to Cyperus polystachyos.
The species name congestus is Latin and means crowded and probably referring to snug way in which the fruit lies along the spikelet. The only known synonym for the species is Mariscus congestus as described by C.B.Clarke.

Distribution
It colonises easily and has been introduced into Australia, where it has now become naturalised.
Recognised as a weed in Western Australia it is found in swamps and around creeks in coastal areas of the Wheatbelt, Peel, South West, Great Southern and Goldfields-Esperance regions where it grows in sandy-clay soils. The species is also found in coastal areas of New South Wales, Victoria, South Australia, Tasmania and around parts of Brisbane in Queensland. It is also a common weed found in New Zealand and Hawaii.

See also
List of Cyperus species

References

Plants described in 1805
Flora of Western Australia
Flora of Queensland
Flora of South Australia
Flora of Victoria (Australia)
Flora of Tasmania
Flora of South Africa
Flora of Lesotho
Flora of Namibia
Flora of New Zealand
congestus